Minamiukibaru Island (南浮原島, Minamiukibaru-jima), also known as Miukiharu Island, is an islet in the Yokatsu Islands of Okinawa Prefecture, Japan.

It is located southeast of Hamahiga-jima and southwest of Ukibaru-jima.

References 

Yokatsu Islands